Survivor Slovenija: Filipini is the first and only season of the Slovene version of the international reality game show of Survivor. The season was filmed in the Philippines and presented by Miran Stanovnik with the series airing on POP TV from 31 August 2016 to 2 December 2016. After 42 Days, it was Alen Perklič who won in an 8-2-0 jury vote against Sandi Sinanović and Maja Pirc to become the Sole Survivor and win €50,000.

Finishing order

References

External links
 http://www.24ur.com/ekskluziv/survivor/

Slovenia
Slovenian reality television series
2016 Slovenian television seasons
Television shows filmed in the Philippines